Vishnujana Swami (June 2, 1948 - March 16, 1976), born Mark Stephen D'Atillo, was a disciple of A. C. Bhaktivedanta Swami Prabhupada, and a sannyasi within the International Society for Krishna Consciousness (commonly known as the 'Hare Krishnas' or ISKCON) who disappeared in 1976. He made recordings of himself singing the Hare Krishna mantra.

Life
He was born as Mark Stephen Datillo on June 2, 1948, in San Jose, California to parents Maureen (née Desmet) (1924-2017) and Joseph D'Attilo (1923-2006). At the age of seventeen, he moved to San Francisco along with his girlfriend, whom he then married. In 1966–1967 Vishnujana first came into contact with the Hare Krishnas, and by 1968 he had received initiation from Srila Prabhupada and became a full-time member of the movement.  On July 20, 1970, he was ordained a sannyasa.

Career
Vishnujana played the harmonium and mridanga. Musical recordings of Vishnujana would later be released in 1995

By 1973, he led a group of Hare Krishnas, the Radha-Damodara Traveling Sankirtan Party (named after the particular murtis (idols) carried on the bus), in a proselytizing bus trip across the USA.

In March 16, 1976, during the Gaura Purnima festival in India, Vishnujana Swami disappeared.

In 1999, a biography of Vishnujana Swami entitled Radha-Damodara Vilasa was published by Vaiyasaki das Adhikari.

Discography

References

Sources

External links
Vishnujana & Prabhupada Kirtan (VN024-06)

International Society for Krishna Consciousness religious figures
Converts to Hinduism
1948 births
1976 deaths
American Hare Krishnas
Performers of Hindu music
20th-century Indian singers
1976 suicides
Suicides by drowning